ITL can refer to:
 International Territorial Level, geographic classification in the United Kingdom.
 Imaging Technology Laboratory, part of the University of Arizona's Steward Observatory
 In the Labyrinth, a role-playing system built on The Fantasy Trip
 Inferential theory of learning
 Information Technology Limited, a British computer company of the 1980s (formerly CTL)
 Information Technology Laboratory, a NIST laboratory since 2010
 Institute of Technology Law, National Chiao Tung University a law school in Taiwan
 Interval Temporal Logic, a temporal logic
 Islamic Tools and Libraries, a subproject of Arabeyes software which provides Hijri dates, Muslim prayer times and Qibla
 Italian lira, the former currency of Italy that had ISO 4217 code ITL 
 Iterative test-last, opposite of iterative test-first software development process 
 Estonian Association of Information Technology and Telecommunications, abbreviated in Estonian as ITL
ITL, Russian-language abbreviation for "correctional labor camp", used in the names of GULAG labor camps